Prvni brnenska strojirna Velka Bites, a. s. ("First Brno Engineering Plant", known as PBS VB) is a Czech engineering and manufacturing company. It focuses mainly on the development, testing, and production of devices for the aircraft industry. Together with PBS Energo, a.s.; PBS Brno, a.s. and PBS Aerospace Inc., PBS VB is a member of PBS GROUP, a.s.

History 
The history of PBS VB has been closely related to the company PBS Brno, originally founded in 1814 by Jan Reiff, who established a textile mill near Brno. As the company was growing, new facilities were built. PBS VB was established in 1950 in Velká Bíteš, Czech Republic to support industrial development of the region.

The first products produced in PBS VB were hammer drills and parts for mining and metallurgical pneumatic tools. In 1951 a production of fittings started.

Modernisation and extension of the production capacities connected with an investment casting hall construction were finished in 1970. At the same time, the company entered the aviation world by developing an auxiliary power unit for Aero L-39 Albatros aircraft.

After gaining experience in the technology of auxiliary power units and environmental control systems, in 2004 PBS VB expanded its product portfolio and included propulsion units – turbojet, turboshaft and turboprop engines for small manned or unmanned aircraft, UAVs and target drones.

PBS VB delivers its products globally and since the 1970s more than 7,000 pieces of turbine equipment for the aerospace industry have been manufactured by PBS VB in total.

Organisation 
PBS VB is member of the PBS GROUP composed of:

 PBS Enegro, a.s. active in the power industry
 PBS Brno, a.s. providing services in relation to the construction of power generation and district heating units
 PBS Aerospace Inc., a subsidiary of the PBS GROUP, which is responsible for expanding the business activities in the field of aerospace technology, especially on the American markets
PBS Velká Bites, a. s. a globally recognised hi-tech manufacturer of power units and other equipment in the field of aerospace

PBS VB has its headquarters in the Czech Republic with other locations in the USA and India.

The company is approved by the European Aviation Safety Agency (EASA) holding the DOA (Design Organization), POA (Production Organization) and MOA (Maintenance Organization) approvals and is ISO 9001 and ISO 14001 certified.

Among others, the PBS is a member of the DSIA (Defence and Security Industry Association Czech Republic) and ALV Czech Republic (Association of the Czech Aerospace Industry).

Products and services 
PBS VB specialises in design and development of small jet engines for aircraft, UAVs and target drones; auxiliary power units and environmental control systems for aircraft and helicopters along with all the connected manufacturing processes including precision casting, hi-tech machining of metals and subsequent assembly of finished products.

Apart from aviation equipment, PBS VB offers products and services in areas of precision casting (turbine wheels, turbine blades, spinner disks for insulation wool and femoral components), cryogenic technology (helium expansion turbines, compressors and pumps) and electroplating services.

Aerospace products

Turbojet jet engines 
 PBS TJ40-G1 – max thrust: 395 N, outer diameter: 147 mm, length: 304 mm, weight: 3.3 kg
 PBS TJ40-G2 – max thrust: 395 N, outer diameter: 147 mm, length: 373 mm, weight: 3.8 kg
 PBS TJ80-120 – max thrust: 1,200 N, outer diameter: 235 mm, length: 514 mm, weight: 12,8 kg
 PBS TJ100 – max thrust: 1,300 N, outer diameter: 272 mm, length: 625 mm, weight: 19.5 kg
 PBS TJ150 – max thrust: 1,500 N, outer diameter: 272 mm, length: 520 mm, weight: 19.6 kg

Turboprop engines 

 PBS TP100 – Max. power: 180 kW, electrical power output: 720 W, length: 891 mm, weight: 61.6 kg

Turboshaft engines 

 PBS TS100ZA – Max. power: 180 kW, 5978 rpm, electrical power output: 720 W, length: 829 mm, weight: 56.7 kg
 PBS TS100DA – Max. power: 180 kW, 2158 rpm, electrical power output: 720 W, length: 881 mm, weight: 61.3 kg

Auxiliary power units

 SAFIR 5K/G MI – power supply: 3x 115 V/200 V/ 400 Hz, max. bleed air: 28.3 kg/min, max. altitude: 6,000 m, weight: 64 kg. The unit is designed to deliver compressed air for starting the main engines and to supply AC to the deck network of medium heavy helicopters. 
 SAFIR 5K/G MIS – power supply: 28 V DC, max. bleed air: 28.3 kg/min, max. altitude: 6,000 m, weight: 57 kg. The unit is designed to deliver compressed air for starting the main engines and to supply AC to the deck network of medium heavy helicopters.
 SAFIR 5L – max. bleed air: 32 kg/min, max. altitude: 8,000 m, weight: 42 kg. The unit is designed to supply compressed air for starting the main engines of subsonic light aircraft.
 SAFIR 5K/G Z8 – power supply: 3x 115 V/200 V/ 400 Hz, max. altitude: 6,000 m, weight: 48.5 kg. The unit is designed to supply AC for starting the main engines, as well as to the deck network of medium heavy helicopter.

Environmental control systems
All systems are designed for air-conditioning and ventilation of the main cockpit and other parts of the machine.

Metallurgy and precision casting

PBS VB produces wheels, blades and components made predominantly from IN 713C, IN 713LC and MarM247, i.e. nickel and cobalt-based alloys:

Turbine wheels (weight: 0.15 – 44 kg, dimensions: ø50 - ø400 mm).

Turbine blades and gas turbine segments (weight: 0.1 – 30 kg, length: 50 – 400 mm).

Spinner discs for the production of glass wool-based insulation made from nickel-based superalloys 141I or 2.4879, or of Co alloys. Alloy 141I is a developed directly in PBS for the spinners with long life durability.

Femoral components (10 various types of cobalt-based knee replacements).

References

External links
 
 US website

Engineering companies of the Czech Republic
Czech brands
Aircraft engineering companies
Manufacturing companies of Czechoslovakia
Gas turbine manufacturers